David Edward John Townsend (born 26 October 1965) is a former English cricketer.  Townsend was a right-handed batsman who bowled right-arm medium pace.  He was born at Tiverton, Devon.

Townsend made his debut for Devon in the 1993 Minor Counties Championship against Wiltshire.  From 1993 to 2002, he represented the county in 10 Championship matches, the last of which came against Oxfordshire.  His MCCA Knockout Trophy debut for the county came against Dorset in 1993.  He played one further Trophy match for Devon, which came in 2002 against Wiltshire.

He also represented Devon in a single List A match against Derbyshire in the 1993 NatWest Trophy.  In this match, he scored 29 runs before being bowled by Matthew Vandrau.

His younger brother, Gareth, played first-class cricket for Somerset.  He also played List A cricket for Surrey, Devon and a combined Minor Counties team.

References

External links
David Townsend at Cricinfo
David Townsend at CricketArchive

1965 births
Living people
Sportspeople from Tiverton, Devon
Cricketers from Devon
English cricketers
Devon cricketers